Mitromorpha barrierensis is a species of sea snail, a marine gastropod mollusk in the family Mitromorphidae.

Description

Distribution
This species is endemic to New Zealand and occurs off Little Barrier Island, North Island.

References

 Powell, A.W.B. 1979: New Zealand Mollusca: Marine, Land and Freshwater Shells, Collins, Auckland

Further reading
 

barrierensis
Gastropods described in 1942
Gastropods of New Zealand